Barbara Jean Morris is an American academic administrator who currently serves as the 18th president of Prescott College.

Education 
Barbara Jean Morris completed a B.A. in political science at San Diego State University. Morris earned an M.A. and Ph.D. in political science at the University of California, Santa Barbara.

Career 
For 16 years, Morris worked at the University of Redlands, and later as dean of the college of arts and sciences. In 2011, she became provost and vice president for academic affairs at Fort Lewis College and was the elected representative from the academic council to serve on the Colorado Commission on Higher Education.

On July 1, 2018, Morris succeeded Nancy Kleniewski as the 8th president of the State University of New York at Oneonta. She is the second woman to serve in this role at SUNY Oneonta. During her tenure at SUNY Oneonta, Morris led the reimagining of the college’s mission statement: "We nurture a community where students grow intellectually, strive socially, and live purposefully". Morris also created the first Memorandum of Agreement (MOA) with United University Professionals (UUP) in New York State, acknowledging the importance of adjunct teaching faculty, giving the title and salary increase. She also collaborated with UUP to create uniform tenure and renewal policy and guidelines. Morris worked toward the inclusion of all students, administrators, and faculty staff, and brought into leadership people of different races, ethnicity, sex, marital status, and more. She broadened governance representation on the president’s cabinet and reformulated the Budget Committee to give it more influence, and added more faculty voices. She provided students with a voice in decision-making including giving the Student Association a seat on Cabinet and the Budget Committee. Morris also created a campus police task force at SUNY Oneonta to explore the relationship of the college's police department with students, staff, faculty, and the community.

In October 2020, Morris resigned from SUNY Oneonta under criticism that her administration mishandled planning for students to return to campus during the COVID-19 pandemic. The university had a coronavirus outbreak that infected more than 740 students in the weeks after reopening.

On July 15, 2021, Morris succeeded John Flicker to become the 18th president of Prescott College in Prescott, Arizona. After arriving at Prescott, Morris led the campus community in updating the Mission, Vision, and Values to reflect the College's experiential and student-centric leaning model. The six new values include Inclusive Community, Experiential and Field-Based Learning, Culture of Creativity, Justice, Individualized Education, and Regenerative Sustainability.

Works and publications 
Morris co-authored the manuscript, Recreating the Circle, which was published with The University of New Mexico Press. This book is a collaboration centering on the relationship between tribal, state, federal, and local governments. In addition, her co-authored article “Faith and Sex: Presidents under Pressure: Electoral Coalitions and Strategic Presidents” looks at the Executive Office of the President and women’s and religious interest groups. Organizational theory, leadership practices, and strategies for cooperation all inform her research. Her co-authored article “Feminist Organizational Structure in the White House: The Office of Women’s Initiatives and Outreach,” investigates how organizational cultures impact leadership styles has helped her to recognize the importance of identifying organizational cultures in the practice of leadership.

Personal life 
Morris' father, Bobby Morris, is Cherokee and Comanche. She has 3 children. In July 2019, she climbed Mount Kilimanjaro.

See also 

 List of women presidents or chancellors of co-ed colleges and universities

References 

Living people
Heads of universities and colleges in the United States
Women heads of universities and colleges
Place of birth missing (living people)
San Diego State University alumni
University of California, Santa Barbara alumni
University of Redlands faculty
Fort Lewis College faculty
State University of New York at Oneonta faculty
American people of Cherokee descent
American people of Comanche descent
Women deans (academic)
American university and college faculty deans
Year of birth missing (living people)
20th-century American academics
21st-century American academics